Bull Creek is a rural unincorporated community in Osceola County, Florida, United States.

Bull Creek is part of the Orlando–Kissimmee Metropolitan Statistical Area.

Geography
The community name derives from Bull Creek and the Bull Creek Wildlife Management Area that borders it. It is in the Eastern Standard time zone.

The latitude of Bull Creek is 28.093N. The longitude is -80.976W.

History
George W. Hopkins purchased  in east-central Florida in 1902, including what would become Bull Creek. Hopkins build a small railroad to move timber, mostly Cypress to his sawmill in Melbourne, the area was heavily logged from 1912 until 1928.
 
Cypress is still being harvested from the area surrounding Bull Creek but the trees are smaller and used mostly for mulch.

In 1967,  were purchased by the state for flood control, the Bull Creek area feeds the Saint Johns River and a large levee was built to control the water released into the river. In 1970, the state-owned land was leased to the Florida Fish and Wildlife Conservation Commission (FWC) to be used as a wildlife management area (WMA). The Bull Creek WMA was renamed for former Fish and Wildlife Conservation Commission chairman Hershey A. “Herky” Huffman (1937-2011), a native Floridian, avid outdoorsman and a staunch environmentalist.

Demographics
The population of Bull Creek consists of less than 100 mostly working-class families who prefer a rural lifestyle.

Zoning is agricultural with no more than one single-family home per  allowed, agricultural land can be used for conservation, cattle, timber and other agricultural uses.

Recreation
Fishing at Billy Lake, Crabgrass Creek and Bull Creek is common and when in season deer, hog, turkey and small game hunting is available.

References

 Bull Creek 2003 Land management plan

Unincorporated communities in Osceola County, Florida
Greater Orlando
Unincorporated communities in Florida